Aftermath Media is a multimedia company based in Ashland, Oregon. It was founded by Rob Landeros and David Wheeler in 1997.

Background
Both Landeros and Wheeler had previously worked at Trilobyte, makers of the bestselling CD-ROM computer game The 7th Guest. In 1999 Aftermath released the interactive movie Tender Loving Care, a project which had been started by Landeros and Wheeler at Trilobyte. Landeros produced and designed the interactive features while Wheeler wrote and directed the film. Later they released another interactive movie, Point of View. Once again, Landeros produced and designed while Wheeler wrote and directed.

See also
 List of companies based in Oregon

External links 
 Aftermath Media website
 

Mass media companies established in 1997
Companies based in Ashland, Oregon
1997 establishments in Oregon